Secrets of the Sea is a 2008 album by Loquat.

2008 albums